Lohuti is a town and jamoat in north-western Tajikistan. It is part of the city of Konibodom in Sughd Region. The jamoat has a total population of 21,652 (2015).

References

Populated places in Sughd Region
Jamoats of Tajikistan